Bernard Vincent Herbert (20 February 1889 – 14 December 1949) was an Australian rules footballer who played in the VFL between 1909 and 1921 for the Richmond Football Club. He served as Richmond's President from 1932 to 1935 and again in 1939.

He later became an inspector in the Victorian Police Force, and was awarded the 'Valour' award for bravery while on duty.

References 

 Hogan P: The Tigers of Old, Richmond FC, Melbourne 1996
 Richmond Football Club – Hall of Fame

External links

 
 

1889 births
1949 deaths
Australian rules footballers from Melbourne
Australian Rules footballers: place kick exponents
Richmond Football Club players
Brunswick Football Club players
Richmond Football Club Premiership players
Richmond Football Club administrators
Two-time VFL/AFL Premiership players
People from Collingwood, Victoria